The  was a bureau of the Meiji government.

It was established in 1877 to administer matters related to religion, including shrines and temples, and Sect Shinto such as Tenrikyo and Kurozumikyō. It was a bureau of the Home Ministry.

In April 1900 (33rd year of Meiji), the bureau was divided into two bureaus, the Bureau of Shrines and the Bureau of Religion. Temples, Christianity and new religions were transferred to the Bureau of Religion. This was an official acknowledgement of Secular Shrine Theory or the idea that Shrine Shinto was not a religion and as a result under state control, hence the separate Bureau of Shrines under the Home Ministry.

See also 

 Department of Divinities
 Ministry of Religion
 State Shinto
 Association of Shinto Shrines

References 

Government agencies established in 1877
Buddhism in the Meiji period
Shinto
Home Ministry (Japan)
Religious policy in Japan
Defunct government agencies of Japan
Pages with unreviewed translations